= Emil Glöckner =

German painter (1868 - after 1921)

Emil Gustav Adolf Glöckner (10 April 1868 in Dresden – after 1921) was a German painter in oils and watercolours, and a commercial artist. He painted mythological pictures, portraits, and landscapes.

== Gallery ==
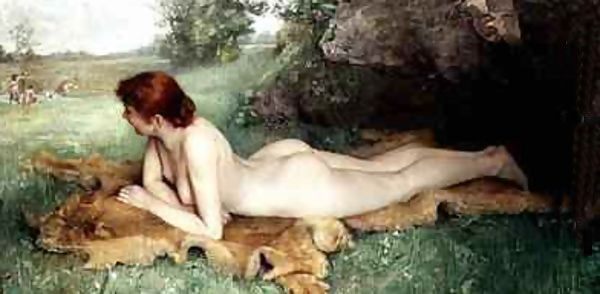
The Naiad, c. 1900

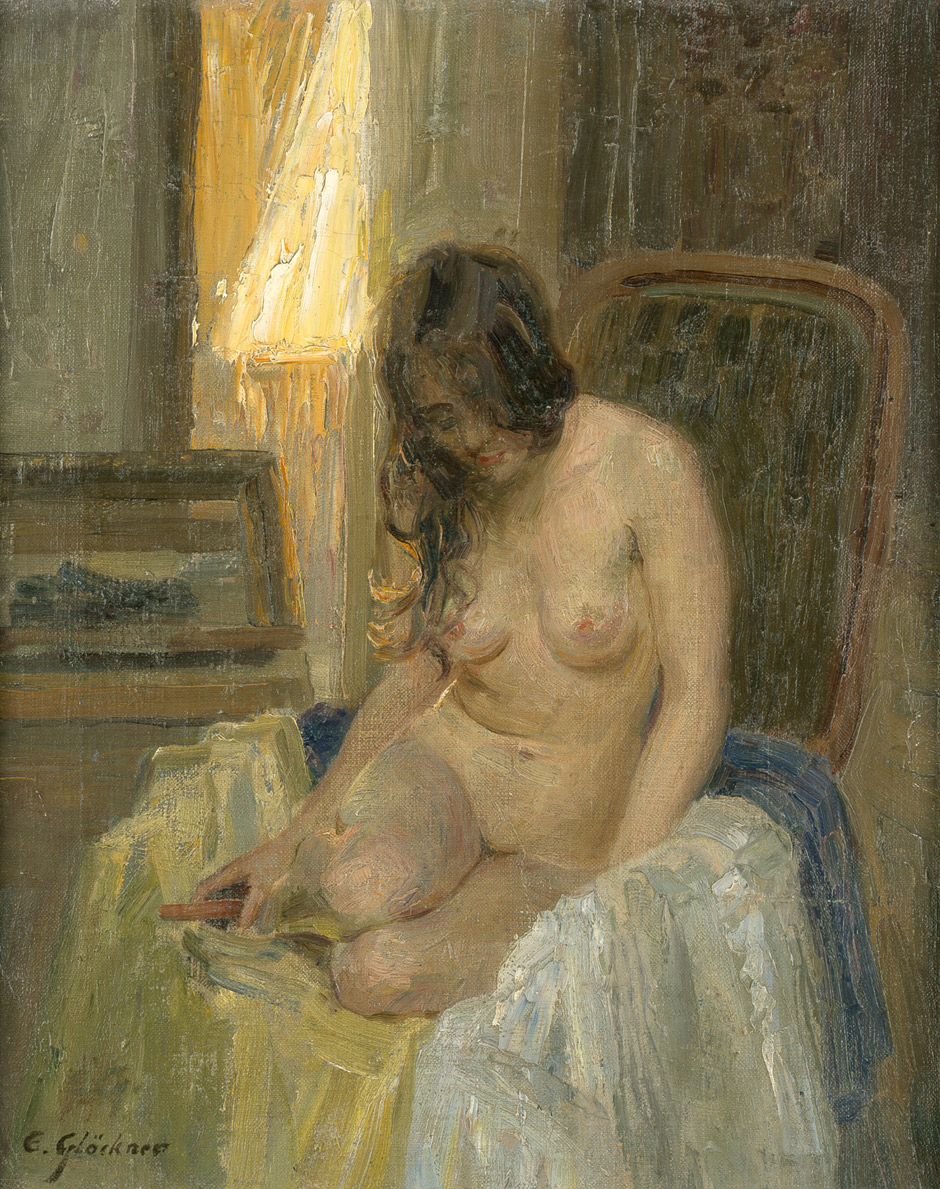
[Female nude], 1910

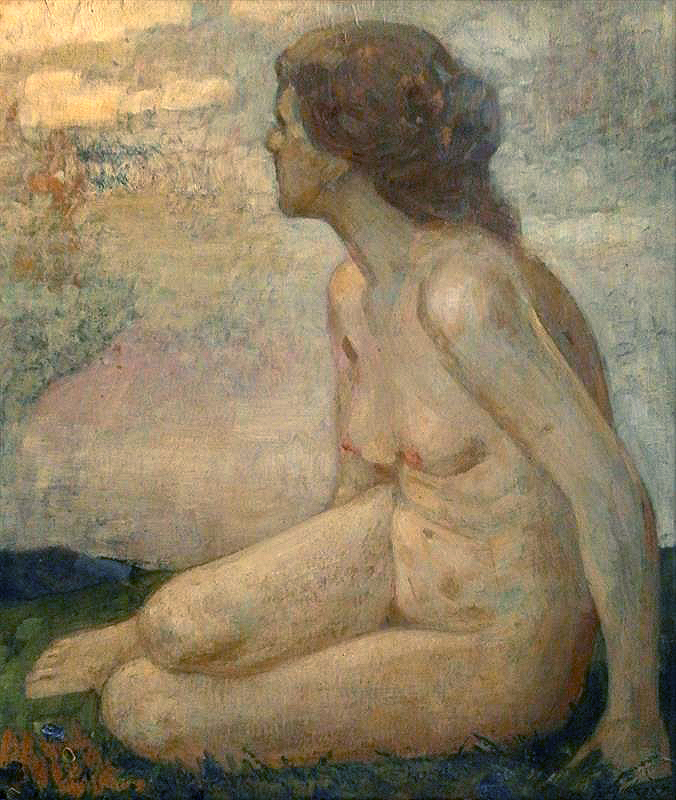
Female nude, c. 1910

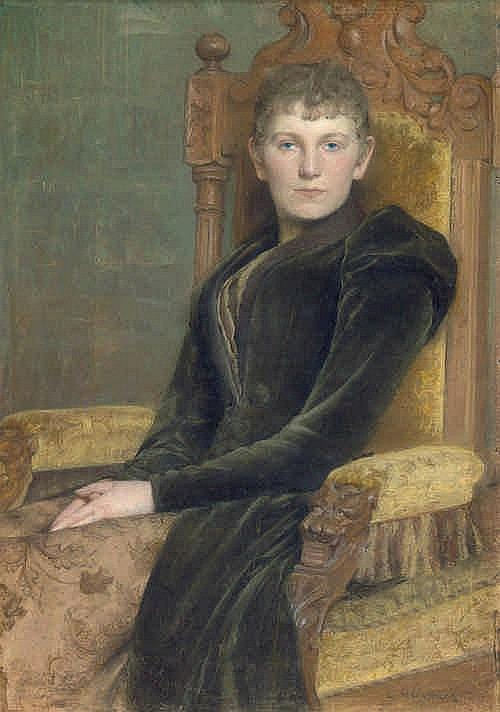
Portrait of a seated lady in a velvet dress, c. 1910

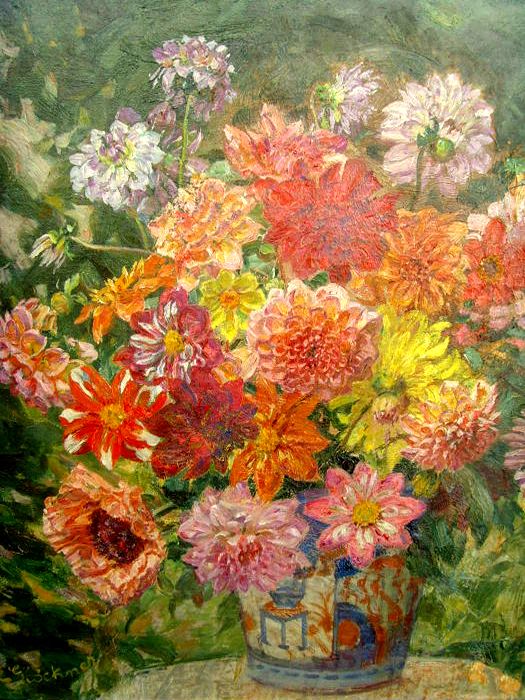
Large bouquet of dahlias, c. 1910

== Sources ==
- Gericke, Stefanie (2021). "Glöckner, Emil". Allgemeines Künstlerlexikon (online ed.). K. G. Saur, De Gruyter.
- "Glöckner, Emil Gustav Adolf". Benezit Dictionary of Artists (online ed.). Oxford University Press. 2011. doi:10.1093/benz/9780199773787.article.B00075666.
